Alexander McCandless (January 1, 1861 – January 5, 1939) was Mayor of Victoria, British Columbia  from 1902 to 1903.

References

Mayors of Victoria, British Columbia
1861 births
1939 deaths